Theodore Colbert III (born 1973) is a businessman who is the Chief Executive Officer of Boeing Defense, Space & Security at The Boeing Company since March 2022. Previously, he was the CEO of Boeing Global Services. Prior to that, he was the Chief Information Officer at The Boeing Company.

Education
He graduated in 1996 from Georgia Institute of Technology where he obtained Bachelor's in Industrial Engineering. He received a bachelor's degree in General Science from Morehouse College. He is a member of Alpha Phi Alpha, Gamma Lambda Chapter.

Awards
He has been listed in 2013 and 2022 by the National Society of Black Engineers as Black Engineer of the Year. He was the first awardee for the Fisher Center prize for Excellence in Driving Transformation from the Fisher Center For Business Analytics at UC Berkeley.

Sanctions
In September 2022, Foreign Ministry of China spokesperson Mao Ning announced at a press briefing that China has imposed sanctions on Colbert and Raytheon Technologies CEO Gregory J. Hayes, in response to the U.S. arms sale to Taiwan. It is not immediately known what the Chinese sanctions against Colbert and Hayes would entail, and it is often mainly symbolic in nature.

References

External links 

1964 births
Living people
American chief executives of manufacturing companies
Boeing people
Georgia Tech alumni
Morehouse College alumni